

Recruit can refer to:

Military 
 Military recruitment
 Recruit training, in the military
 Rekrut (English: Recruit), a military recruit or low rank in German-speaking countries 
 Seaman recruit

Books
Le Réquisitionnaire (English "The Conscript" or more commonly "The Recruit"), a short story by Honoré de Balzac  published in 1831  
The Recruit (novel), the first book of the children's CHERUB series

Film and TV
 Recruits (TV series), a 2009 Australian TV series about the New South Wales Police Force
 Recruits: Paramedics, a 2011 Australian factual television program about New South Wales Paramedics
 The Recruit, a 2003 film starring Al Pacino and Colin Farrell
 The Recruit (Australian TV series), a 2014–2016 Australian rules football reality television series
 The Recruit (American TV series), a 2022 American spy-adventure television series released by Netflix
 "The Recruit" (Dad's Army), an episode of the 1973 British TV series Dad's Army

Brands and enterprises
  Recruit (company), a Japanese advertising, publishing, and human resources company

Ships
 , various ships of Britain's Royal Navy
 , various ships of the U.S. Navy

See also
Recruitment